Kaaron Conwright (born August 8, 1976) is an American sprinter who specializes in the 100 metres.

As a sprinter at Cal Poly San Luis Obispo, Kaaron Conwright was a 3 time all-American in the 100m and a 2 time all-American in the 200m. In the Big West Conference, he was a 4-time champion in the 100m from the years of 1996-2000 where he still holds the conference record at 10.12. He later went on to run a 10.10 at the national championships that same year. He was also a 2-time champion in the 200m. 
  
In 1999, he ran first leg on the gold medal winning 4 × 100 m relay at the World University Games in Palma De Mallorca, Spain.  In 2000, he placed third at the Collegiate National Championships in the 100m. In 2001, he repeated his performance running first leg on the silver medal winning 4 × 100 m relay at the World University Games in Beijing, China.

At the 2002 IAAF World Cup he won the 4 x 100 metres relay race together with Jon Drummond, Jason Smoots and Coby Miller. At the 2006 IAAF World Cup he won the 4 x 100 metres relay again, this time with Wallace Spearmon, Tyson Gay and Jason Smoots, in a championship record of 37.59 seconds.

His personal best time over 100 metres is 10.05 seconds, achieved in July 2000 in Flagstaff. His personal best time over 60 metres is 6.61 seconds, achieved in March 2003 in Boston. In the 200 metres, he has 20.59 seconds, achieved in July 2002 in Rome.

Served as Head sprint coach for the National Korean Federation from 2007 through 2008.

He now serves as assistant coach under Olympian and Olympic Coach John Smith.

References

ncaa.org
bigwest.org/sport

1976 births
Living people
American male sprinters
Athletes (track and field) at the 1999 Pan American Games
Universiade medalists in athletics (track and field)
Place of birth missing (living people)
Universiade gold medalists for the United States
Medalists at the 1999 Summer Universiade
Medalists at the 2001 Summer Universiade
Pan American Games track and field athletes for the United States